β-Hydroxybutyryl-CoA (or 3-hydroxybutyryl-coenzyme A) is an intermediate in the fermentation of butyric acid, and in the metabolism of lysine and tryptophan.  The L-3-hydroxybutyl-CoA (or (S)-3-hydroxybutanoyl-CoA) enantiomer is also the second to last intermediate in beta oxidation of even-numbered, straight chain, and saturated fatty acids.

See also
 Crotonyl-coenzyme A
 Acetoacetyl CoA
 Beta-hydroxybutyryl-CoA dehydrogenase

References

Biomolecules
Metabolism
Thioesters of coenzyme A